Báč is a village and municipality in the Dunajská Streda District in the Trnava Region of south-west Slovakia.

History
In the 9th century, the territory of Báč became part of the Kingdom of Hungary.
In historical records the village was first mentioned in 1319.
After the Austro-Hungarian army disintegrated in November 1918, Czechoslovak troops occupied the area, later acknowledged internationally by the Treaty of Trianon. Between 1938 and 1945 Báč once more became part of Miklós Horthy's Hungary through the First Vienna Award. From 1945 until the Velvet Divorce, it was part of Czechoslovakia. Since then it has been part of Slovakia.

Geography
The municipality lies at an altitude of 126 metres and covers an area of 3.923 km2. It has a population of about 525 people.

Genealogical resources

The records for genealogical research are available at the state archive "Statny Archiv in Bratislava, Slovakia"
 Roman Catholic church records (births/marriages/deaths): 1802-1896 (parish A)
 Lutheran church records (births/marriages/deaths): 1706-1709, 1783-1895 (parish B)
 Reformated church records (births/marriages/deaths): 1783-1895 (parish B)
 Census records 1869 of Bac are not available at the state archive.

See also
 List of municipalities and towns in Slovakia

References

External links
Surnames of living people in Bac

Villages and municipalities in Dunajská Streda District
Hungarian communities in Slovakia